Roger Neville McClay, QSO (born 6 February 1945) is a former New Zealand politician. In 2010 he was convicted for defrauding two charities.

Early life
McClay was born in 1945. He attended secondary school at Wesley College, Auckland.

Member of Parliament

A teacher by profession, he was an MP from 1981 to 1996, representing the National Party. He was first elected to Parliament in the 1981 election as MP for Taupo, defeating the incumbent Labour MP, Jack Ridley.

In the 1984 election, he contested and won the new seat of Waikaremoana, which he held until he retired at the 1996 election. He became Minister of Youth Affairs and Associate Minister of Education and Social Welfare during the Fourth National Government. He later held the role of Commissioner for Children from 1998 to 2003.

His son Todd McClay was elected as the National Party Member of Parliament for Rotorua at the 2008 general election.

Post-parliament career
In the 2005 New Year Honours, McClay was made a Companion of the Queen's Service Order (QSO).

McClay was the chairman for Keep New Zealand Beautiful until July 2009. He has been involved in a number of other charities, including the New Zealand Spinal Trust, World Vision, Heart Children New Zealand, Variety, the Children's Charity and For the Sake of Children.

In March 2010 he was charged with misuse of taxpayer-subsidised flights. In August the same year he pleaded guilty. He repaid the two charities that he had defrauded, Keep New Zealand Beautiful and World Vision. He was convicted and given a sentence of 300 hours of community work. In addition, he was stripped of his travel benefits by the Parliamentary Services Commission.

References

New Zealand National Party MPs
Children's Ombudspersons in New Zealand
People from Auckland
New Zealand educators
New Zealand public servants
1945 births
Living people
People educated at Wesley College, Auckland
Members of the New Zealand House of Representatives
New Zealand MPs for North Island electorates
Companions of the Queen's Service Order
New Zealand politicians convicted of fraud